Rudolfina is a genus of flies belonging to the family of the Lesser Dung flies.

Species
R. cavernicola Marshall & Fitzgerald, 1997
R. digitata Marshall, 1991
R. opuntiae (Richards, 1967)
R. prominens (Duda, 1925)
R. rozkosnyi (Roháček, 1975)

References

Sphaeroceridae
Sphaeroceroidea genera
Muscomorph flies of Europe
Diptera of North America
Diptera of South America